Colette Yver (28 July 1874 – 17 March 1953) was a French Roman Catholic writer from Normandy, the winner of the 1907 Prix Femina for her work Princesses de science.

Biography 
She would publish about a book (novels, essays, or hagiographies) a year for the next fifty years of her life. Her works are representative of the anti-feminist fictions which abounded under the Third Republic. Intended for a female audience, these types of novels depicted emancipated women confronted with multiple misfortunes that they would not have suffered had they chosen life at home.

In 1907, she won the prix Femina (then called prix Vie Heureuse, présided by Jeanne Lapauze) for Princesses de science, A book referring to the difficulties encountered by women in reconciling family and scientific careers. In 1913 she entered the jury of this award, of which she was long the dean, until 1951. In 1917, she was admitted to the Académie des sciences, belles-lettres et arts de Rouen.

Her sister Marguerite (1869-1961), wife of Dr. Guillaume, a young widow with two children in 1896, a professor of French until an advanced age in free education, gave  tales for children under the pseudonym "Hélène Avril".

She is buried at cimetière monumental de Rouen next to her brother, painter Édouard de Bergevin.

She was made a chevalier of the Légion d'honneur (decree 11 August 1931).

Essays, novels 

1907: Princesses de science, Calmann-Lévy, (crowned by the Prix Vie Heureuse, previous name of the Prix Femina)
1911: Le Métier de Roi, Calmann-Lévy 
1916: Comment s'en vont les Reines, Calmann-Lévy, 
1919: Les cousins riches
1920: Dans le jardin du féminisme
1909: Les Dames du Palais
1926: Aujourd'hui...
1928: La Bergerie
1908: Les Cervelines, Calmann-lévy
1929: Femmes d'aujourd'hui
1931: Vincent ou La Solitude
1932: Le Vote des femmes
1912: Un coin du voile
1913: Les sables mouvants in Revue des Deux mondes
1928: Le mystère des béatitudes
1917: Mirabelle de Pampelune
1928: Le festin des autres1928: L'homme et le dieu1928: Vous serez comme des dieux1928: Haudequin de Lyon Bibliography 
 Léon Abensour, Histoire générale du féminisme des origines à nos jours, Delagrave, Paris, 1921 ; 1979 .
 Michel Manson, Colette Yver, jeune auteure pour la jeunesse de 1892 à 1900, in "Cahiers Robinsons", n° 5, 2004, Juvenilia (écritures précoces)'', issue directed by Guillemette Tison, .
 Rebecca Rogers and Françoise Thébaud, La fabrique des filles. L'éducation des filles de Jules Ferry à la pilule, Paris, Éditions Textuel, 2010

External links 
 Colette Yvert on Babelio

20th-century French non-fiction writers
Writers from Normandy
20th-century French women writers
French Roman Catholic writers
Prix Femina winners
1874 births
People from Maine-et-Loire
1953 deaths
Chevaliers of the Légion d'honneur